Scleranthus brockiei is a species of flowering plants first described by PA Williamson. Scleranthus brockiei belongs to the genus Scleranthus, and family Caryophyllaceae.

References 

Caryophyllaceae